The Central League is an amateur status league competition run by Capital Football for Association football clubs located in the southern and central parts of the North Island, New Zealand. From 2021 it is at the second level of New Zealand Football below the National League, which has replaced the national association based ISPS Handa Premiership.

League history
The premier league was initially set up as one of the three feeder leagues to the New Zealand National Soccer League in 1992, and continued in this form until being disbanded at the end of the 1999 season. The league was reinstated in 2005 as the top club league for the central region of New Zealand football, and the current strength of the league is demonstrated by it providing the past Chatham Cup winners in 2009 (Wellington Olympic), 2010 (Miramar Rangers), 2011 (Wairarapa United) and 2015 (Napier City Rovers).

Renaming and restructuring of leagues in the country
In March 2021, New Zealand Football announced a change to the structure of both the premiership and the top regional leagues around the country. The four top regional leagues (NRFL Premier, Central Premier League, Mainland Premier League and the FootballSouth Premier League) would be formed into the Northern League, Central League, and the Southern League. These leagues would allow local clubs to qualify for the premiership season (now known as the National League Championship), with the top 4 teams from the Northern League, the top 3 teams from the Central League, and the top 2 teams from the Southern League making up the competition, alongside the Wellington Phoenix Reserve side. All teams that qualify plus the Phoenix Reserves, would then play a single round-robin competition between September and December.

League format
The league currently comprises 10 teams, who play each other twice in the season on a home-and-away basis. At the conclusion of the season the winner are crowned champions and with the next two sides proceed to the National League. The bottom side is relegated automatically to their regional league (either Capital Premier or the Federation League), with the top eligible sides from each of those leagues playing a two-legged playoff for promotion.

Current clubs

As of the 2022 season. Wairarapa United was entered as one of the originally 10 teams to play the 2022 season but withdrew with just two weeks to go before the start of the season. They were replaced by Wellington United who had originally missed out on promotion to Havelock North Wanderers.

Past clubs

{| class="wikitable sortable"
|-
! Club
! Location
! Home Ground(s)
! Last Played
! Promoted Club
|- 
| Havelock North Wanderers
| Guthrie Park
| Havelock North
| 2022
| Stop Out
|-
| Wairarapa United
| Masterton
| Memorial Park
| 2021
| Withdrew before the 2022 season and replaced by Wellington United.
|-
| Lower Hutt City
| Lower Hutt
| Fraser Park
| 2021
| Wellington Phoenix Reserves
|-
| Wainuiomata
| Wainuiomata, Lower Hutt
| Richard Prouse Park
|2021
| Havelock North
|-
| Palmerston North Marist
| Palmerston North
| Central Energy Trust Arena
|2017
| Waterside Karori
|-
| Team Taranaki
| New Plymouth
| Yarrow Stadium
| 2017
| Havelock North
|- 
| Tawa
| Tawa, Wellington
| Redwood Park
| 2015
| Wellington United
|-
| Upper Hutt City
| Upper Hutt
| Maidstone Park
| 2014
| Stop Out
|-
| Maycenvale United
| Hastings
| Hastings Sports Park
|2012
| Upper Hutt City
|-
| Gisborne City
| Gisborne
| Childers Road Reserve 
|2007
| Withdrew end of season 2007. Replaced by Team Taranaki
|-
| Red Sox Manawatu
| Palmerston North
| Central Energy Trust Arena
|2006
| Team Taranaki
|-
| Raumati Hearts
| Raumati, Kapiti Coast
| Weka Park
|  1999
| League disbanded
|-
| Western Rangers FC
| Hastings
| St Leonard's Park
| 1999
| League disbanded
|-
| Manawatu AFC
| Palmerston North
| Skoglund Park
|  1998
| Promoted to the 1999 New Zealand island soccer leagues.
|-
| Wanganui East Athletic
| Wanganui
| Wembley Park
| 1997
| Waterside Karori
|-
| New Plymouth City
| New Plymouth
| Marfell Park
|1996
| NP City renames as Mt. Taranaki. Placed in Division One for 1997. Folded at season's end.
|-
| Seatoun | Seatoun, Wellington
| Seatoun Park
| 1996
| Placed in Division One for 1997, withdrew from Central League in 1998.
|-
| Stokes Valley| Stokes Valley, Lower Hutt
| Delaney Park
| 1996
| Withdrew from Central League at end of season
|-
| Tararua United| Upper Hutt
| Harcourt Park
| 1996
| Placed in Division One for 1997, merged in 1998 to become Upper Hutt City Soccer
|-
| Moturoa| New Plymouth
| Onuku Taipari Domain
|  1994
| Napier City Rovers
|-
|}

Top scorers
The following list is from the 2021 season onwards after New Zealand Football changed the football league system in New Zealand. From 2021, the Central League has acted as a qualifier league to the National League.

Records
The following records are from the 2021 season onwards after New Zealand Football changed the football league system in New Zealand. From 2021, the Central League has acted as a qualifier league to the National League. The records are up to date as of the end of the 2022 season.
 Most wins in a season: 15 – Wellington Olympic (2021)
 Fewest defeats in a season: 1 – Wellington Olympic (2021 & 2022)
 Most goals scored in a season: 71 – Wellington Olympic (2022)
 Fewest goals conceded in a season: 15 –Wellington Olympic (2022)
 Most points in a season: 47 – Wellington Olympic (2021)
 Fewest points in a season: 4 – Wainuiomata (2021)
 Highest goal difference: 56 –  Wellington Olympic (2022)
 Biggest home win: – Lower Hutt City 12–1 Wainuiomata (26 June 2021)
 Biggest away win: – Western Suburbs FC 1 - 11 Wellington Olympic (14 August 2022) Highest scoring match: 13 goals' – Lower Hutt City 12–1 Wainuiomata (26 June 2021)

MVP Winners

Past Champions
Source: 
1992 – Wanganui East Athletic
1993 – Manawatu
1994 – Tawa
1995 – Wainuiomata
1996 – Western Suburbs
1997 – Miramar Rangers
1998 – Western Suburbs
1999 – Island Bay United
2000–2004 – no competition''
2005 – Western Suburbs
2006 – Miramar Rangers
2007 – Western Suburbs
2008 – Miramar Rangers
2009 – Western Suburbs
2010 – Wellington Olympic
2011 – Miramar Rangers
2012 – Napier City Rovers
2013 – Miramar Rangers
2014 – Miramar Rangers
2015 – Napier City Rovers
2016 – Wellington Olympic
2017 – Western Suburbs
2018 – Napier City Rovers
2019 – Western Suburbs
2020 – Miramar Rangers
2021 – Wellington Olympic
2022 – Wellington Olympic

References

External links
 National League official website
 Capital/Central Region official website

2